A gyro tower, or panoramic tower, is a revolving observation tower with a vertical moving platform. A gyro tower's observation deck is not simply raised to provide its passengers a spectacular view, it is also rotated around the supporting mast, either once in the raised position or while traveling up and down the center mast.

Gyro towers are seldom part of funfairs but can be found more often in permanent amusement parks. A well-known American gyro tower is the Kissing Tower at Hersheypark.

A special gyro tower is the Space Tower atop the Euromast in Rotterdam. It may be the only gyro tower standing on a roof of a structure and not on the ground.

Notable gyro towers
 Carolina Skytower, Carowinds, North Carolina, U.S.
 Sky Cabin, Knott's Berry Farm, Buena Park, California U.S.
 Kissing Tower, Hersheypark, Hershey, Pennsylvania, U.S.
 Star Tower, California's Great America, San Jose, California U.S.
 Sky Tower, SeaWorld San Diego, San Diego, California U.S.
 Sky Tower, SeaWorld Orlando, Orlando, Florida U.S.
 Sky Trek Tower, Six Flags Great America, Gurnee, Illinois, U.S.
 Panorama Tower, Heide-Park, Germany
 Space Tower, Minnesota State Fair, Falcon Heights, Minnesota, U.S.
 Infinito, Terra Mitica, Spain
 Taming Sari Tower, Malacca, Malaysia (First gyro tower in Malaysia)
 Panoraama, Linnanmäki, Helsinki, Finland
 La Gyrotour, Futuroscope, France
 Observation Tower, Hangzhou Paradise, Hangzhou, Zhejiang, China
 Top of Texas Tower, State Fair of Texas, Dallas, Texas U.S.,

Defunct
 Space Spiral, Cedar Point, Sandusky, Ohio, U.S., (Demolished September 12, 2012)
 Skyscraper, Geauga Lake, Aurora, Ohio, U.S., (Dismantled in July 2009, turned to scrap)
 Polo Tower, Morecambe, United Kingdom (Disused from 1999, passenger car removed in 2008. Demolished June 2017)
 Space Needle, Main Street Pier, Daytona Beach, Florida U.S., (On the beach, dismantled September 2012)
 Unknown, Seville Expo '92, Sevilla, Spain., (Built for 1992 Sevilla's World Fair, and then the Cartuja Island city park. Dismantled in 1996). 
 Astro Needle, Myrtle Beach, South Carolina, U.S., (dismantled mid-1980s)
 Falls Tower, Niagara Falls, Clifton Hills, Canada (dismantled November 2006)
 Fun Pier Sky Tower Wildwood, New Jersey, U.S., (dismantled 2009)
 Sky Tower, Atlantic City, New Jersey, Central Pier, (dismantled November 1989)
 Astroneedle, Six Flags AstroWorld, Houston, Texas U.S., (Dismantled in 2000)
 Panoramic, Meli Park, Belgium (Closed 2009)
 Sky Tower, Marineland of the Pacific, Palos Verdes, California U.S. (closed 1987, dismantled September 1995)
 Astrotower, Astroland, New York, U.S. (disused from 2010, being shortened due to structural concerns, 2013)
 Space Needle State Fair Park, Oklahoma City, Oklahoma, U.S. (closed 2010 after flood damaged electrical system, dismantled 2018)
 Totem Tower, Fort Dells later Dells Crossroads, Wisconsin Dells, Wisconsin. (opened June 1st, 1966, 4th ride of this kind in US, 7th in the world, 335ft tall. Park closed permanently in 1990, tower auctioned sometime before 1997 to a private party)
 Sky Tower, Rhyl, United Kingdom. Passenger car removed in 2017. Tower still standing. Used as a Light pole
 Spirale, La Ronde, Montreal, Quebec, Canada (Opened in 1967 double cabin. Closed in 2018, tower still standing)

See also
 List of Intamin observation towers
 Top of the World – once the tallest transportable gyro tower in the world
 Astroland, Coney Island (New York City)

References

External links

 Malacca Taming Sari - First gyro tower in Malaysia | Virtual Malaysia

Amusement rides

fr:Tour d'observation#Super Gyro Tower